Dan Olof Olofsson (born 24 September 1950 in Ekenäs, Finland) is a Swedish entrepreneur, business leader and philanthropist.

Biography 
Dan Olofsson was born as the second oldest of five siblings in Ekenäs, Finland, where his father was employed as pastor of Karis from 1948 to 1951. His parents and family are rooted in Kaxås, in Jämtland in northern Sweden. When Olofsson was one year old his family moved to Malmö in southern Sweden, where he was brought up and still lives.

Olofsson attended upper secondary technical school at Pauliskolan in Malmö and graduated as Master of Science in Engineering at Lunds Tekniska Högskola in 1974. After his education, Olofsson began a career in the technology consulting industry. He started at VBB (what is now Sweco) where he during 1979 became group manager for a new venture in energy technology. Later, Dan Olofsson proceeded to become region manager for Scandiaconsult's southern division.

The Danir Group 
The family business Danir was founded in 1986. Dan Olofsson has gradually, together with his son Johan Glennmo and with a long-term focus, built this group of companies which in 2022 is expected to have a turnover of almost SEK 13 billion. The Group has grown primarily through new hires and the start-up of new companies, and now has 11,600 employees in 25 countries.

The main business is consulting companies that focus on supporting customers in their digitalization. This is run within the framework of Sigma, Nexer, A Society, and PION Group. The Danir Group also has financial investments.

Thanda and Star for Life
In 2002, Dan Olofsson decided to build the safari facility Thanda Safari with more than 14,000 hectares of land in South Africa. The safari facility is a conservation project to protect endangered species and has also for several years received the World Travel Award as “The World's Leading Luxury Lodge”. In 2016, the marine reserve Thanda Island opened just off the coast of Tanzania and was awarded “The World’s Leading Exclusive Private Island” by World Travel Awards.

Olofsson’s philanthropic commitment is best seen through the organization Star for Life, which he and his wife Christin launched in 2005. So far, 500,000 young people has participated in a four-year preventive programme against HIV/AIDS, promoting a healthy way of life, in South Africa, Namibia, and Sri Lanka. Since 2013, Star for Life is also established in Sweden under the name ‘Motivationslyftet’, aiming to strengthen young people's self-esteem and belief in the future. In 2021, Star for Life was started in Jerusalem with a focus on improving the living conditions of the inhabitants of East Jerusalem through investments in education and jobs.

Uppstart Malmö and Project Kaxås 
In 2011, Olofsson initiated the founding of "Uppstart Malmö", a trust aimed at creating more job opportunities in the under-privileged areas of his hometown Malmö. The concept behind the trust is to offer advice, support and financial help to local entrepreneurs who create more jobs, and to help young people and immigrants enter the labor market. Altogether, more than 3,500 people have found work through this initiative.

To break the depopulation in sparsely populated areas of Norrland's interior and ensure the survival of Kaxås village school, Project Kaxås was started in 2019. The idea was to invest in young families who want to live a safe life close to nature and still have access to a functioning labour market including teleworking. By moving in young families from different places in Sweden, the number of inhabitants in Kaxås increases from 100 to about 260, of which the number of children increases by over 60. The eco-village Ladriket is an important part of Project Kaxås.

Miscellaneous 
In the autumn of 2012, Olofsson’s autobiography Mina tre liv (“My three lives”) was published by the publishing house Ekerlids Förlag. The book has received particular attention for its claim that the Swedish government should have committed a financial miscarriage of justice at financier Maths O Sundqvist.

In recent years, Olofsson has actively participated in the public debate on issues relating to business conditions and entrepreneurship, about the defense of freedom of choice in welfare, and about the need for a policy that combines a positive climate for companies with social responsibility.

Dan Olofsson is the uncle of the artist Jonathan Johansson and the father of Andreas Olofsson, who played guitar in The Animal Five.

Bibliography 
My three lives: about enterprise, engagement and violation of justice. Stockholm: Ekerlid. Libris.

Awards
 2001 – South Swedish county of Skåne's Greatest Entrepreneur
 2004 – City of Malmö Ambassador of the Year
 2008 – The Pegasus Prize 
 2008 – The Community Philanthropy Award at Global Business Coalition in New York
 2011 – Entrepreneurial Role model of the Year by Founders Alliance
 2011 – H.M. The King's Medal 12th size for important contributions to Swedish business and philanthropic commitment
 2012 – The Royal Patriotic Society Business Medal for outstanding entrepreneurship
 2012 – The magazine Veckans Affärer’s Social Capitalist Award, given to role models who through business try to solve problems in society
 2015 – Olofsson was honored with the Swedish Region Skåne's award for exceptional efforts for the development of Skåne
 2015 – Awarded an honorary doctorate by the Faculty of Technology and Society at Malmö University in Malmö, Sweden, for contributing to resolve societal problems through the use of information and communication technology
 2015 – Awarded an honorary doctorate by the University of FASTA in Argentine, for his citizenship and philanthropic efforts in Africa and Sweden
 2015 – Awarded The Confederation of Swedish Enterprise' (Swedish: Svenskt Näringsliv) Nicolin Prize for his contributions to the public debate for a better understanding of the importance of enterprises
 2018 – Dan Olofsson is chosen to become a member of the Robert F. Kennedy Human Rights Leadership Council
 2019 – Appointed 2019's Growth Entrepreneur in Malmö, Sweden
 2021 – Jerusalem Mayor's Medal of Honor for long-term support of the Jewish nation and work to improve the living conditions of the residents of East Jerusalem.

References

External links 
 Danir
 Sigma Group
 Nexer Group
 Star for Life
 Thanda Private Game Reserve
 Uppstart Malmö

1950 births
Living people
Swedish businesspeople
Lund University alumni
People from Scania
Swedish nonprofit businesspeople